The 2014 United States Senate election in Hawaii took place on November 4, 2014, the general Election Day in the United States, concurrently with other elections to the United States Senate in other states as well as elections to the United States House of Representatives and various state and local elections.

Incumbent Democratic Senator Brian Schatz was appointed to the office in December 2012, following the death of longtime senator Daniel Inouye. The special election determined who would serve the remainder of Inouye's term, which ended on January 3, 2017.

The Hawaii primary elections took place on August 9, 2014, but the Democratic primary remained unresolved until August 15 due to areas affected by damage from Tropical Storm Iselle. Schatz narrowly fended off a primary challenge from U.S. Representative Colleen Hanabusa and then went on to defeat the Republican nominee, former State Representative Campbell Cavasso, in a landslide.

Background 
Daniel Inouye announced that he planned to run for a record tenth term in 2016, when he would have been 92 years old. He also said, "I have told my staff and I have told my family that when the time comes, when you question my sanity or question my ability to do things physically or mentally, I don't want you to hesitate, do everything to get me out of here, because I want to make certain the people of Hawaii get the best representation possible." Inouye died on December 17, 2012. Prior to his death, Inouye left a letter encouraging Governor Neil Abercrombie to appoint Congresswoman Colleen Hanabusa to succeed Inouye should he become incapacitated.

Hawaii law allows the Governor to appoint an interim Senator "who serves until the next regularly-scheduled general election, chosen from a list of three prospective appointees that the prior incumbent's political party submits". Abercrombie appointed the Lieutenant Governor of Hawaii Brian Schatz as U.S. Senator, citing Hanabusa's seniority on the United States House Committee on Armed Services as a chief reason not to appoint her to the position.

Democratic primary

Candidates

Declared 
 Brian Evans, singer and candidate for the U.S. Senate in 2004
 Colleen Hanabusa, U.S. Representative
 Brian Schatz, incumbent U.S. Senator

Declined 
 Esther Kia'aina, Deputy Director of the Hawai'i Department of Land and Natural Resources
 Gil Kahele, State Senator

Endorsements

Debates 
 Complete video of debate, July 14, 2014

Polling 

 * Internal poll for Brian Schatz campaign
 ^ Internal poll for Colleen Hanabusa campaign

Delay in election result 
Primary elections in Hawaii were held on August 9, 2014. However, two precincts in Puna on Hawaiʻi Island did not open due to damage from Hurricane Iselle, and the approximately 8,255 voters in those precincts instead voted on August 15. The two leading Democratic candidates, Colleen Hanabusa and Brian Schatz, were initially separated by only 1,635 votes, meaning that the outcome was officially uncertain until voting in Puna was finished. However, an analysis by Hawaii News Now showed that Hanabusa would need to win approximately 65% of the vote in the outstanding precincts to overtake Schatz, something she had not managed in any other precinct in the state. Thus, Schatz was seen as the likely winner. After voting in Puna was completed, Schatz was declared the winner by a slightly increased margin of 1,769 votes. Hanabusa conceded on August 19.

Results

Republican primary

Candidates

Declared 
 Campbell Cavasso, former State Representative and nominee for the U.S. Senate in 2004 and 2010
 Harry Friel, businessman
 Eddie Pirkowski, candidate for the U.S. Senate in 2006, 2010 and 2012
 John Roco, founder of Saint Damien Advocates and candidate for the U.S. Senate in 2010 and 2012

Declined 
 Charles Djou, former U.S. Representative (running for HI-01)
 Linda Lingle, former Governor of Hawaii and nominee for the U.S. Senate in 2012

Results 
Vote totals listed do not include two precincts that will vote on August 15.

Libertarian primary

Candidates 
 Michael Kokoski

Results

Independent primary

Candidates 
 Joy Allison
 Arturo Pacheco Reyes

Results 

Neither of the candidates polled enough votes to meet Hawaii's strict criteria for independents to participate in the general election.

General election

Predictions

Polling

Results

References

External links 
 U.S. Senate elections in Hawaii, 2014 at Ballotpedia
 Campaign contributions at OpenSecrets
 Brian Schatz for U.S. Senate
 Eddie Pirkowski for U.S. Senate
 Campbell Cavasso for U.S. Senate
 Colleen Hanabusa for U.S. Senate
 John Roco for U.S. Senate

2014
Hawaii
United Staets Senate
Hawaii
Hawaii 2014
United States Senate 2014